Cyonosaurus is a genus of gorgonopsian therapsids from the late Permian and possibly early Triassic of South Africa. The type species Cyonosaurus longiceps was named in 1937.

See also

 List of therapsids

References 

 Vertebrate Palaeontology by Michael J. Benton
 paleodb.org
 Sigogneau D. 1970. Révision systématique des Gorgonopsiens sud-africains. Cahiers de Paléontologie: 417

Gorgonopsia
Prehistoric therapsid genera
Lopingian synapsids of Africa
Fossil taxa described in 1937
Lopingian genus first appearances
Lopingian genus extinctions